The 1963 NAIA World Series was the seventh annual tournament hosted by the National Association of Intercollegiate Athletics to determine the national champion of baseball among its member colleges and universities in the United States and Canada.

The tournament was played at Phil Welch Stadium in St. Joseph, Missouri.

Sam Houston State (27-8) defeated Grambling (28-4) in the championship series, 2–1, to win the Bearkats' first NAIA World Series.

Sam Houston State shortstop Jimmy Dodd was named tournament MVP.

Bracket

See also
 1963 NCAA University Division baseball tournament

Reference

NAIA World Series
NAIA World Series
NAIA World Series